Kallivere is a village in Mustvee Parish, Jõgeva County in Estonia. Kallivere has a population of 26.

References

Villages in Jõgeva County